Indonesian law affecting Chinese-Indonesians were conducted through a series of laws, directives, or constitutions enacted by the Government of Indonesia that affected the lives of Chinese Indonesians or Chinese nationals living in Indonesia since the nation's independence. The laws were made against Chinese Indonesians.  Most of these laws are revoked following Reformation era under president Abdurrahman Wahid.

1950
In the early 1950s the Government of Indonesia implemented the Benteng program (fortress program), under which only Native Indonesians (pribumi) were allowed to have licenses to import certain items. This rule gave rise to the term "Ali Baba", referring to illicit co-operation between Chinese businessmen and native Indonesians who had connections in the government bureaucracy.

Presidential Regulation 10 of 1959

Presidential Regulation 10 of 1959 was a law directive issued by Indonesian government and signed by Minister of Trade, Rachmat Mujomisero. The law prohibited foreign nationals from doing retail business in rural areas and required them to transfer their businesses to Indonesian nationals by 1 January 1960 or relocate to urban areas. This directive was approved by President Sukarno. The rule became controversial since its implementation resulting in several people being killed in West Java (also known as racial riot of Cibadak) and triggered a huge exodus of Chinese Indonesians back to China. Although the regulation merely mentioned that only "foreign citizens" were required to do the relocation and closure of business, the law affected many Chinese nationals and Chinese Indonesians. From the 86,690 foreign business retailer listed, about 90 percent of these were Chinese.

Background
Right after the Indonesian Independence in 1945, the Indonesian people were overwhelmed by the euphoria of "freedom" and took over many foreign companies: this action was referred to as "Anti-Dutch sentiment". Among others, one was a Dutch company Koninklijke Paketvaart-Maatschappij (KPM), a company serving in sea transportation from Netherlands to Indonesia. Marhaen, a labour group that later on become a political party, took over this company. Other foreign capital seized were oil fields, by the oil labourers claiming themselves as "Laskar Minyak" (The Oil Defenders).

After a while, the Government of Indonesia realised that unskilled and inexperienced Indonesians were unable to run the company. The Indonesians, referred to as Kaum pribumi, also did not have enough capital, and it was almost impossible to compete with foreign investment and the Chinese capital (before independence, the ethnic Chinese had more chances to do business from colonialist ruler). These companies suffer losses after the seizure. As a solution, the Government of Indonesia signed an agreement during Dutch-Indonesian Round Table Conference in The Hague, the Netherlands, which stated that the government of Indonesia would return all seized foreign investment assets to its previous owner. In return, to strengthen up the weak Indonesians (pribumi), the Government of Indonesia had the right to issue a law or directive to protect the national interest and those who were "economically feeble".

On 19 March 1956, during Indonesian National Importer Congress in Surabaya (Kongres Importir Nasional Indonesia), Asaat Datuk Mudo made an opening oration that the Chinese had become monopolistic in doing their business by closing all possible entry routes for Indonesian nationals to join the trade market.

As a closing statement, Assat also added that he believes this was the time to have a special economy initiative to protect Indonesian (pribumi).

Asaat's speech became the beginning of "Asaat movement" or "Pro Indonesian (term used was for Indonesian was Pribumi) movement" and had a huge impact on the following rules favouring it. In November 1959, PP Nomor 10 Tahun 1959 was issued.

In the 1950s, almost all retail stores in Indonesia were owned by Chinese or Chinese-Indonesians from grocery stores, hardware stores and even restaurants. Alwi Sahab, a Betawi culture expert stated that during his youth in Kwitang, Central Jakarta, the economic centre was in Jakarta fully dependent on the Chinese or Chinese Indonesian businessman.

Implementation, protest and counter action
Tempo magazine investigation published in year 2009 mentioned that during the implementation, the law affected 86,690 foreign retailers listed (90 percent Chinese) to about 500,000 were affected. However, Waspada daily in their commemorative anniversary published their story printed in the 1960s during the happening, and it had a different number, according to Waspada daily only about 25,000 small groceries booths by foreign retailers (mainly) Chinese affected by PP No. 10.

The sanctions specified in the directive were only property confiscation (all items had to be given to cooperatives), fines, and forced relocation, but, in practice, there were also some offenders executed (Cimahi and Cibadak, West Java).

In some places, the law was enforced by the military. The military shot dead two Chinese women, which triggered a riot in Cimahi, Jawa Barat. It was also noted that the Chinese were forced to leave their home and properties. However, while, nationwide, the implementation of this law went smoothly, in some places like Bandung and Medan, there were Chinese merchants trying to stop the implementation of PP 10 by hiding or emptying the stores and piling the goods in warehouses, causing price increases of main food materials. Specially, after another government directive was issued about price adjustments, according to the Attorney General Special Instruction, in some areas, including North Sumatra, Economic Survaillance Teams were formed to watch certain issues in economy such as stabilising prices and making appropriate actions to everyone who withhold the food program implemented by the government. The Economic Surveillance Team in North Sumatra manage to secure 200 warehouses in Medan consisting of food materials, the merchants being punished by imprisonment.

The law was meant to strengthen the national economy in Indonesia, yet this law resulted in a tense diplomatic relation between Republic of Indonesia and the People's Republic of China (PRC). During a meeting between State Minister Subandrio and Chinese Ambassador to Indonesia (Huang Chen) in Jakarta, the PRC insisted that PP No. 10 should be reviewed, and the request was denied. Later on during a parliamentary hearing, State Minister Subandrio restated that there is no element of anti-Chinese related in the implementation of PP No. 10, the law being solely the beginning of nationalisation and socialisation in the Indonesian economy, and as part of the Indonesian revolution movement. On the nationalisation part, PP No. 10 stated that foreign retailers must be closed outside ibukota kabupaten and the merchant had to live only in his property, which was not allowed to conduct any business activities. Foreigners had to close their business at the latest on 1 January 1960 and give all their assets to cooperatives.

The Government of PRC was upset. On 10 December 1959, Peking radio announced a campaign for Chinese citizen to return to "The Warmth of Motherland". The PRC Embassy in Jakarta soon listed all Chinese citizens interested in returning to China. About 199,000 applied, but only 102,000 managed to be placed in a ship sent by the PRC government. The tension between PRC Government and Government of Indonesia reduced after PRC Prime Minister Zhou Enlai met President Sukarno.

Pro and cons
According to Mestika Zed from Andalas University, Padang, West Sumatera, Asaat Datuk Mudo was a real nationalist and always reacted according to facts and reality. The economy of pribumi (Native Indonesian) after independence was weak with no one defending them. Meanwhile, even during Dutch Imperialism, the Chinese always had a better economy than the pribumi. After Indonesian independence, they took over the economy from small, middle, and large scale. Assaat's ideas were later adopted but in a somewhat different form by Tun Abdul Razak and Mahathir Mohamad as the Malaysian economy policy to protect the majority and indigenous ethnic Malay in Malaysia, which was then faced with a similar economic situation. The Malaysian Government do not seize business ownerships and assets of ethnic Chinese Malaysians. Malays were instead encourage to participate more in economic and business activities of the nation by being given preferential treatment by the government. This involves granting of cheap or generous terms loans as capital to start business. Bids for government projects, contracts, procurement & requisitions were open only to Malay-owned businesses. Malay farmers were given free land, farming equipment & fertilizers and products bought at heavily-subsidized prices.

From historical perspective, even in the beginning of Indonesian Independence the Chinese were always being suspected because they were divided into three groups: "Pro-Dutch", "Pro-Chinese Government", and "Pro-Indonesian Nationalist Movement". There are also Indonesian Chinese who agree that it was needed to do an assimilation or pribumization of Indonesian Chinese (also known as the Tionghoa) through religion (Islam and PITI) as Moslem organization. They have given their support and chances to Chinese-Indonesians to prove that they want to become a "good Indonesian citizen". There is also a lot of co-operation between the Chinese and the Indonesians noted during Indonesian national movement. Even some of the prominent Chinese figures were trying hard to make the Chinese-Indonesian return to Indonesia. Yap Thiam Hien, a Chinese-Indonesian lawyer, famous for his Indonesian nationalist idealism, established Baperki (Indonesian Citizenship Discussion Body) in 1954. The organization's purpose was to make Chinese-Indonesians willing to be Indonesian citizens, specially to those that take the Indonesian side, as opposed to the Dutch and the Chinese Government. This body also gave a lot of contribution in proposing the Indonesian Citizenship Law 1958, which was implemented on the beginning of 1960. The discriminative rule also noted as an attempt to maintain politics of divide and conquer.

Leo Suryadinata, a Chinese-Indonesian now teaching in National University of Singapore (NUS), thinks that both fortress rules or PP 10/ 1959 is the beginning of the anti-Chinese movement in Indonesia. According to Suryadinata, during colonialism by the Dutch, the Chinese-Indonesians were mostly small retailers, but after Indonesian independence, their position was strengthened, which is why pribumi think that they cannot compete and would like to take over the power by using the government.

Cabinet Presidium Decision 127 of 1966

Cabinet Presidium Decision 127 of 1966 (127/U/Kep/12/1966) was an Indonesian law passed in 1966 that suggested Indonesian-sounding names to be adopted by Indonesian Chinese. It was considered to be part of the anti-Chinese legislation in Indonesia. The resident Chinese community in Indonesia resented it because it forced them to lose traditional family names. However, some people thwarted the government efforts to some degree by incorporating their Chinese name into their new Indonesian name.  For example, the Chinese family name "Tan" was easily embedded in the Indonesian name "Sutanto".

Presidential Decision 240 of 1967
Presidential Decision 240 of 1967 (Keppres No. 240/1867) mandated assimilation of "foreigners" and supported a previous directive, 127/U/Kep/12/1966, for Indonesian Chinese to adopt Indonesian-sounding names.

Presidential Instruction 14 of 1967

Presidential Instruction No. 14/1967 (Inpress No. 14/1967) on Chinese Religion, Beliefs, and Traditions effectively banned any Chinese literature and cultures in Indonesia, including the prohibition of Chinese characters. Although Chinese names were not explicitly mentioned, "newly naturalized" Indonesian Chinese were strongly advised to adopt non-Chinese names. (Annulled by former president Abdurrahman Wahid in Keppres No. 6/2000; annulment supported by former president Megawati Sukarnoputri in Keppres No 19/2002 by declaring Chinese New Year as national holiday.)

1967
Laws affecting Chinese Indonesians proliferated under the New Order regime under former President Suharto's reign. Suharto was a strong advocate for Chinese assimilation rather than integration. As part of 1967's 'Basic Policy for the Solution of the Chinese Problem' and other measures, only one Chinese-language newspaper was allowed to continue, all Chinese religious expressions had to be confined to their homes, Chinese-language schools were phased out, Chinese script in public places was banned, and Chinese were pushed to take on Indonesian-sounding names. Most of this legislation were revoked following Suharto's fall from power in 1998.

Ampera Cabinet Presidium Circular 6 of 1967
Ampera Cabinet Presidium Circular 6 of 1967 was released on 28 June 1967. One of the points of contention is the selection of a proper term to describe Indonesian residents of Chinese descent. Accompanying explanatory text to Article 26 of the 1945 Constitution used the term Tionghoa to describe this group. In 1948, the Communist Party of Indonesia began using Tionghoa in its terminology, prompting the beginning of an unofficial ban on its use. By 1967, a cabinet circular enforced the use of the term Cina over Tionghoa and Tiongkok.

Other examples
 Cabinet Presidium Instruction No. 37/U/IN/6/1967, prohibiting further residency or work permits to new Chinese immigrants, their wives, or children; freezing any capital raised by "foreigners" in Indonesia; closure of "foreign" schools except for diplomatic corps and their families; requiring the number of Indonesian students to be the majority and in proportion to "foreigners" in any state schools; and making implementation of the "Chinese issue" be the responsibility of the minister for political affairs.
 Resolution of the Provisional People's Consultative Assembly No. 32, 1966 (TAP MPRS No. 32/1966), effectively banning the use of Chinese characters in newspapers and magazines.
 Home Affairs Ministry No. 455.2-360/1988 on Regulation of Temples, effectively and severely restricting building or repairing Chinese temples.
 Circular of the Director General for Press and Graphics Guidance in the Ministry of Information No. 02/SE/Ditjen-PPGK/1988, further restricting the usage of Chinese language and/or characters.
 Instruction of the Ministry of Home Affairs No. X01/1977 on Implementing Instructions for Population Registration and the confidential instructions No.3.462/1.755.6 of the Jakarta government 28 January 1980, both authorising special codes in national identification cards to indicate ethnic Chinese origin, the code being A01
 Cabinet Presidium Circular SE-06/Pres-Kab/6/1967 on Changing the Term China and Chinese, requiring the usage of the term "Cina" (considered a derogatory term by many Chinese Indonesians) instead of "Tionghoa" or "Tiongkok" (used by ethnic Chinese themselves).
 the status of Confucianism as one of Indonesia's six official religions was revoked. In 1978, the Minister of Home Affairs issued a directive that there were only five religions, excluding Confucianism. On 27 January 1979, a presidential cabinet meeting took place and it firmly decided that Confucianism was not a religion. Another directive from Minister of Home Affairs was issued in 1990 re-iterating about there being only five official religions in Indonesia.

Anomalies and exceptions
There are exceptions to laws and regulations that ban the use of Mandarin. The use of Mandarin in traditional Chinese medicine prescriptions, for example, is not prohibited, since legal proceedings related to this case have been suspended after lobbying made to the Attorney General (Jaksa Agung) of Indonesia by INI (Ikatan Naturopatis Indonesia).

Current practice
During his tenure as president, Abdurrahman Wahid ended restrictions on Chinese culture and language, and made Chinese New Year a national holiday, but the repercussions of the discrimination then are still felt today and Indonesian Chinese are still discriminated in some regions.

See also
 Chinese Indonesians
 Chinese Indonesian surname
 Supreme Council for the Confucian Religion in Indonesia
 Discrimination against Chinese Indonesians
 1740 Batavia massacre
 1918 Kudus riot
 Mergosono massacre (1947)
 Indonesian mass killings of 1965–66
 Banjarmasin riot of May 1997
 May 1998 Indonesian riots
 Sōshi-kaimei, similar movement in Korea under Japanese rule

Notes

Bibliography
 
 

Anti-Chinese legislation
Anti-Chinese sentiment in Indonesia
Law of Indonesia
Cultural assimilation
Linguistic discrimination
Legislation
Chinese diaspora